Warwick Bridge is a village in the City of Carlisle district of the county of Cumbria, England. It forms part of a small urban area which includes the villages of Corby Hill and Little Corby.

Warwick Bridge lies within the civil parish of Wetheral though Corby Hill and Little Corby are in Hayton parish.

Warwick Bridge is located on the River Eden and the A69 road, near the River Irthing. It is five miles east of the city of Carlisle and four miles from the town of Brampton. The bridge on the Eden, which gave the village its name, was built from 1833 to 1835 by Francis Giles.

The village has a post office in Corby Hill, a Co-operative Food store and 2 churches, one being Our Lady & St Wilfrid's Church and the other St Paul's Holme Eden. There are two large mansion houses near or in the village, Warwick Hall  and Holme Eden Hall built in 1837.

People
Ambulance driver and nurse Pat Waddell was born here in 1892. She returned to the front after losing a leg in WW1.

See also

Listed buildings in Wetheral

References

External links
 Cumbria County History Trust: Wetheral (nb: provisional research only – see Talk page)

Villages in Cumbria
Wetheral